The 2020 WNBA draft was the league's draft for the 2020 WNBA season. A draft lottery was held on September 17, 2019 and the New York Liberty were awarded the first overall pick in the draft. Due to the COVID-19 pandemic the draft was held virtually without players, guests, and the media on-site. The draft was televised as planned; it was the most-watched WNBA draft in 16 years and the second most-watched in ESPN's history.

Draft lottery

The lottery selection to determine the order of the top four picks in the 2020 draft took place during halftime of the Connecticut Sun's semifinal game against the Los Angeles Sparks on September 17, 2019 and was televised on ESPN2.  Four non-playoff teams qualified for the lottery drawing: Indiana Fever, Dallas Wings, New York Liberty, and Atlanta Dream.

Lottery chances

The lottery odds were based on combined records from the 2018 and 2019 WNBA seasons. In the drawing, 14 balls numbered 1–14 are placed in a lottery machine and mixed. Four balls are drawn to determine a four-digit combination (only 11–12–13–14 is ignored & redrawn). The team assigned that four-ball combination receives the No. 1 pick.  The four balls are then placed back into the machine and the process is repeated to determine the second pick. The two teams whose numerical combinations do not come up in the lottery will select in the inverse order of their two-year cumulative record. Ernst & Young knows the discreet results before they're announced.

The order of selection for the remainder of the first round as well as the second and third rounds is determined by inverse order of the teams' respective regular-season records solely from 2019.

The lottery was won by the New York Liberty, who had the best chance to win the lottery.  The Dallas Wings were awarded the second pick, followed by the Indiana Fever and finally the Atlanta Dream.

Eligibility
Under the current collective bargaining agreement (CBA) between the WNBA and its players union, draft eligibility for players not defined as "international" requires the following to be true:
 The player's 22nd birthday falls during the calendar year of the draft. For this draft, the cutoff birth date is December 31, 1998.
 She has either:
 completed her college eligibility;
 received a bachelor's degree, or is scheduled to receive such in the 3 months following the draft; or
 is at least 4 years removed from high school graduation.

A player who is scheduled to receive her bachelor's degree within 3 months of the draft date, and is younger than the cutoff age, is only eligible if the calendar year of the draft is no earlier than the fourth after her high school graduation.

Players with remaining college eligibility who meet the cutoff age must notify the WNBA headquarters of their intent to enter the draft no later than 10 days before the draft date, and must renounce any remaining college eligibility to do so. A separate notification timetable is provided for players involved in postseason tournaments (most notably the NCAA Division I tournament); those players must declare for the draft within 24 hours of their final game. The latter timetable proved to be moot due to the coronavirus-induced cancellation of the 2020 NCAA tournament.

"International players" are defined as those for whom all of the following is true:
 Born and currently residing outside the U.S.
 Never "exercised intercollegiate basketball eligibility" in the U.S.

For "international players", the eligibility age is 20, also measured on December 31 of the year of the draft.

Three players with remaining college eligibility, all of whom were juniors in the 2019–20 college season, declared for the draft.  All three were drafted in the first round:
 Satou Sabally of Oregon announced on February 20 that she would enter the draft upon the end of Oregon's 2019–20 season. Although a German citizen, she falls under the rules for U.S. players not only because of playing at Oregon, but also via her birth in New York City.
 Megan Walker of UConn declared on March 14, after the cancellation of the NCAA tournament.
 Chennedy Carter of Texas A&M declared on March 29.

Key

Draft

Honorary picks
The WNBA honored Alyssa Altobelli, Payton Chester, and Gianna Bryant, daughter of Hall of Fame basketball player Kobe Bryant, who all died in the 2020 Calabasas helicopter crash, with honorary draft picks.

First round

Second round

Third round

Footnotes

References

Women's National Basketball Association Draft
WNBA draft
WNBA draft